Yetunde Hawanya Tara Price (August 9, 1972 – September 14, 2003) was the oldest half-sister of and personal assistant to the leading tennis players Venus and Serena Williams. On September 14, 2003, she was murdered in a drive-by shooting in Compton, California, United States by Robert Maxfield.

Background
Price was the oldest of Oracene Price's five daughters. She was one of Venus and Serena Williams’ three other sisters, a half-sibling from a previous marriage between their mother, tennis coach Oracene Price, and Yusef Rasheed.

For a time, Price worked as a personal assistant to her tennis playing sisters and as a nurse. At the time of her death, she also owned a hair salon. According to media reports, Price, despite "accepting some financial assistance" from her sisters, continued to live with her children in their house in a 'run-down' district and continued to work as a nurse, also engaging in her personal-assistant responsibilities which saw her appear at Wimbledon in the year of her death. According to the reports, Price was "determined to pay her own way in the world." Price was the mother of three children.

Murder
On the night of September 14, 2003, Price was chatting with her boyfriend in her SUV, parked outside what subsequently was revealed to be a crack house in suburban Compton, Los Angeles County. According to the prosecution at the subsequent trial, two members of the Southside Compton Crips street gang, who were guarding the house, opened fire on the SUV in the belief that they were "defending [the] crack house from gangland rivals", presumably the Lime Hood Piru. Price's boyfriend, who later stated he did not realize that Price had been shot, drove her to a relative's home, where he called emergency services. Price was pronounced dead shortly after arriving at the hospital, from a bullet wound in the head.

Both the prosecutor and the defense at the murder trial agreed that Price was an innocent victim passing through the area.

Trial
Southside Compton Crips street gang member Robert Edward Maxfield, 25 years old at the time of his conviction, pleaded no contest to voluntary manslaughter on March 22, 2006, the day before his third trial for Yetunde Price's killing was scheduled to start. The first two trials had ended in a mistrial after jurors were unable to reach a verdict. The first trial ended in November 2004 with six jurors voting for acquittal, five for guilt, and one undecided. A second mistrial was declared April 29, 2005, when jurors deadlocked at 11–1 in favor of conviction.

A murder charge against a second defendant, who was accused of firing a handgun during the incident, was dismissed after the first trial, when authorities stated he did not cause the fatal wound.

On April 6, 2006, Judge Steven Suzukawa sentenced Maxfield to 15 years in prison with the possibility of parole. He was released in 2018, but was subsequently re-arrested after violating his parole.

Aftermath
Compton rapper The Game dedicated his 2005 song "Dreams" to Yetunde Price's memory.

In 2016, the Williams sisters opened a community center in Compton for "victims of violence and their families", called the Yetunde Price Resource Center. Its tagline reads: "Committed to helping others heal".

On March 8, 2018, Maxfield, was released on parole from the Deuel Vocational Institution in Tracy, California, having served approximately 12 years of a 15 year sentence in prison. He was re-arrested later that year for violating parole.

In an interview with TIME, Serena Williams said she learned of his release on July 31, through Instagram, ten minutes before her match against Johanna Konta at the 2018 Silicon Valley Classic, a match she went on to lose 6–1, 6–0 to Konta in 52 minutes.

References

External links
 Yetunde Price Resource Center official website

Murdered African-American people
People from Corona, California
People murdered in California
Deaths by firearm in California
Crips
African-American nurses
American nurses
American women nurses
2003 murders in the United States
2003 in California
1972 births
2003 deaths
20th-century African-American women
20th-century African-American people
21st-century African-American people
21st-century African-American women
Serena Williams
Williams family (tennis)